Gerard Joan Vreeland (27 November 1711, Utrecht - 26 February 1752, Colombo) was the 28th Governor of Ceylon during the Dutch period in Ceylon. He was appointed on 6 May 1751 and was Governor until 26 February 1752. He was succeeded by acting Governor Jacob de Jong.

References

1711 births
1752 deaths
18th-century Dutch people
Dutch expatriates in Sri Lanka
Governors of Dutch Ceylon
People from Utrecht (city)